Godfrey is an unincorporated community and coal town in Mercer County, West Virginia, United States.

The community was named for A. I. Godfrey, the original owner of the town site.

References

Unincorporated communities in Mercer County, West Virginia
Unincorporated communities in West Virginia
Coal towns in West Virginia